The people below were all born in, resident of, or otherwise closely associated with the city of Prescott, Arizona.
 Henry F. Ashurst, first Arizona senator following statehood
 Coles Bashford, lawyer, governor of Wisconsin
 Ken Bennett, state senator, Arizona secretary of state
 Big Nose Kate, Wild West companion of Doc Holliday
 Bret Blevins, comic-book artist
 Michael Broggie, historian and author
 William Mansfield Buffum, merchant and member of the Arizona Territorial Legislature
 Robert Burnham, Jr., astronomer
 John G. Campbell, Scottish-born politician
 Thomas Edward Campbell, second governor of Arizona
 Paul. G. Comba, computer scientist and asteroid hunter
 Virginia Lee Corbin, silent film actress
 Antonio De La Fuente, professional boxer
 Rosemary DeCamp, actress
 John Denny, baseball player
 Josephine Earp, wife of lawman Wyatt Earp
 Dorothy Fay, actress
 Alan Dean Foster, science-fiction author
 Ana Frohmiller, county treasurer, gubernatorial candidate
 Barry Goldwater, United States Senator and 1964 Republican Presidential nominee
 Morris Goldwater, Arizona territorial and state legislator, Mayor of Prescott, and businessman
 Paul Gosar, member of the House of Representatives
 Don Imus, radio personality
 John W. Kieckhefer, businessman
 John Kinney, outlaw and founder of the John Kinney Gang (rivals of Billy the Kid's Lincoln County Regulators)
 Fiorello H. LaGuardia, mayor of New York City
 Amy Lukavics, young adult novelist
 Cody Lundin, survival expert, author, and co-star of the Discovery Channel series Dual Survival
 Wayman Mitchell, preacher
 Mollie Monroe, Wild West figure
 Kayla Mueller, human rights activist, humanitarian aid worker taken captive by ISIL while  working with Medecine sans frontiere
 Buckey O'Neill, Mayor of Prescott, sheriff, newspaper editor, miner, and Rough Rider
 Archbishop Peter D. Robinson, United Episcopal Church of North America, rector of St. Paul's Anglican Church
 William C. Rodgers, controversial environmentalist
 William B. Ruger, firearms manufacturer
 Nat Russo, fantasy fiction author, spent childhood and teen years in Prescott; graduated Prescott High School in 1988 
 Holly Sampson, adult film actress
 Alvie Self, musician in Rockabilly Hall of Fame
 Frederick Sommer, photographer
 Dick Sprang, comic-book artist
 Brian Stauffer, award-winning illustrator
 Sam Steiger, former U.S. Congressman and former Mayor of Prescott, 1999–2001
 Piper Stoeckel, Miss Arizona 2012
 Toni Tennille, singer, formerly of Captain and Tennille
 Richard Longstreet Tea, Civil War soldier
 J. R. Williams, drew the mid-20th century comic strips Out Our Way and The Worry Wart, spent most of his life on a ranch near Prescott
 Jay Miner, integrated circuit designer known as "father of the Amiga"
 Tom Whittaker, first disabled person to climb Mount Everest

References

 
Prescott, Arizona
Prescott